St Michael the Archangel's Church is a Grade II* listed parish church in the Church of England in Retford, Nottinghamshire, England.

History

The church dates from the 14th century. It was heavily restored in 1863. The chancel was lengthened in 1889, and a sacristy added at the north east around 1910. The church hall was added in 1978.

It is in a joint parish with 
St. Nicholas' Church, Askham
All Saints' Church, Babworth
St Martin's Church, Bole
Our Lady and St Peter's Church, Bothamsall
St John the Baptist Church, Clarborough
All Saints' Church, Eaton
St Giles' Church, Elkesley
St Peter's Church, Gamston
St. Helen's Church, Grove
St Peter's Church, Hayton
St Martin's Church, North Leverton
St Peter and St Paul's Church, North Wheatley
All Hallows' Church, Ordsall
St Martin's Church, Ranby
St Saviour's Church, Retford
St Swithun's Church, East Retford
All Saints' Church, South Leverton
St Peter and St Paul's Church, Sturton-le-Steeple
St Bartholomew's Church, Sutton-cum-Lound
St Paul's Church, West Drayton

Interior
The chancel screen is by Charles Hodgson Fowler from  1899.

The reredos behind the altar displays a painted Adoration of the Magi, by Sir Ninian Comper.

Organ

The church has a two manual pipe organ by Henry Willis dating from 1876.

See also
Grade II* listed buildings in Nottinghamshire
Listed buildings in Retford

References

14th-century church buildings in England
Church of England church buildings in Nottinghamshire
Grade II* listed churches in Nottinghamshire
Saint Michael
Anglo-Catholic church buildings in Nottinghamshire